Te Mete Raukawa (1836 – 13 August 1926) was a New Zealand tribal leader, assessor and sportsman. Of Māori descent, he identified with the Ngāti Ranginui iwi. He was born in Bethlehem, Bay of Plenty, New Zealand, in about 1836.

References

1836 births
1926 deaths
People from the Bay of Plenty Region
New Zealand Māori public servants
New Zealand sportsmen
Ngāti Ranginui people